Marius Jurczyk (born 5 October 1985) is a German-Polish footballer who plays as a defender for TSV Schornbach.

Career
Jurczyk made his professional debut for 1. FC Heidenheim in the 3. Liga on 20 March 2010, starting in the home match against Holstein Kiel, which finished as a 3–0 win.

References

External links
 Profile at DFB.de
 Profile at kicker.de
 Normannia Gmünd statistics at Fussball.de
 TSG Backnang statistics at Fussball.de
 TSV Schornbach statistics at Fussball.de

1985 births
Living people
People from Głubczyce
Sportspeople from Opole Voivodeship
German footballers
German football managers
Polish footballers
Polish football managers
Polish people of German descent
Association football defenders
1. FC Normannia Gmünd players
1. FC Heidenheim players
SG Sonnenhof Großaspach players
3. Liga players
Regionalliga players